Robert Benedict Seymour Smith  (15 April 1909 – 13 January 1993) was a New Zealand rower.

At the 1938 British Empire Games he won two bronze medals: one in the men's double sculls alongside Gus Jackson; and one in the men's single sculls.

During World War II, Smith served with the 2nd New Zealand Expeditionary Force. In January 1943 he was awarded the Military Medal in recognition of gallant and distinguished services in the Middle East. In June 1943 he was commissioned as a 2nd lieutenant in the New Zealand Engineers.

References

1909 births
1993 deaths
New Zealand male rowers
Rowers at the 1938 British Empire Games
Commonwealth Games bronze medallists for New Zealand
Commonwealth Games medallists in rowing
New Zealand military personnel of World War II
Recipients of the Military Medal
Medallists at the 1938 British Empire Games